A list of the Districts of London located within the London Borough of Tower Hamlets.

The borough is located east of the City of London and north of the River Thames.

Districts

 Aldgate
 Bethnal Green
 Bow
 Bromley-by-Bow
 Cubitt Town
 Hackney
 Limehouse
 Mile End
 Poplar
 Shadwell
 Spitalfields
 Stepney
 Wapping
 Whitechapel
 Millwall

Localities
 Bow Common
 Blackwall
 Cambridge Heath
 Canary Wharf
 Cubitt Town
 Coldharbour
 East Smithfield
 Millwall
 Leamouth
 Old Ford
 Globe Town
 South Bromley

See also

References

External links

 01
Lists of places in London